Jose Valdez may refer to:

 Jose F. Valdez (1925–1945), United States Army soldier and Medal of Honor recipient
 José Valdez (baseball, born 1983), Dominican former baseball pitcher for the Houston Astros
 José Valdez (baseball, born 1990), Dominican baseball pitcher
 José Mario Váldez (born 1931), Salvadoran sport shooter
 José Luis Valdez (born 1998), Argentine footballer